Šlegovo is a small village  in the municipality of Kratovo, North Macedonia. It is believed that it was founded and settled by Sasi-German Saxons.

Demographics
According to the 2002 census, the village had a total of 373 inhabitants. Ethnic groups in the village include:

Macedonians 372
Serbs 1

References

Villages in Kratovo Municipality